The 42nd annual Toronto International Film Festival was held from 7 to 17 September 2017. There were fourteen programmes, with the Vanguard and City to City programmes both being retired from previous years, with the total number of films down by 20% from the 2016 edition. Borg/McEnroe directed by Janus Metz Pedersen opened the festival.

According to a "fact sheet" released by the Festival before it began, this edition included 255 feature-length films and 84 short films. Of the feature films, 147 are claimed to be world premieres. The number of Canadian films at the Festival (including co-productions) is listed as 28 features and 29 shorts. Christopher Nolan's Dunkirk received a special IMAX 70mm screening at the Cinesphere as part of the main film slate and the 50th anniversary of IMAX, making it the first Nolan film to appear at the festival since Following, nineteen years earlier.

Awards
The festival's final awards were announced on 17 September.

Juries

Platform Jury 
Chen Kaige
Małgorzata Szumowska
Wim Wenders

Canadian Feature Film Jury
Ella Cooper
Mark Adams
Min Sook Lee

Short Cuts Film Jury
Chloé Zhao
Johnny Ma
Marit van den Elshout

Programmes
The following films were selected:

Gala presentations
55 Steps by Bille August
Borg McEnroe by Janus Metz Pedersen
Breathe by Andy Serkis
C'est la vie! by Olivier Nakache & Éric Toledano
Chappaquiddick by John Curran
Darkest Hour by Joe Wright
Film Stars Don't Die in Liverpool by Paul McGuigan
Hochelaga, Land of Souls by François Girard
Kings by Deniz Gamze Ergüven
The Leisure Seeker by Paolo Virzì
Long Time Running by Jennifer Baichwal and Nicholas de Pencier
Mary Shelley by Haifaa al-Mansour
The Mountain Between Us by Hany Abu-Assad
Mudbound by Dee Rees
My Days of Mercy by Tali Shalom Ezer
Stronger by David Gordon Green
Three Christs by Jon Avnet
The Upside by Neil Burger
The Wife by Björn Runge
Woman Walks Ahead by Susanna White

Special presentations
BPM (Beats per Minute) by Robin Campillo
A Fantastic Woman by Sebastián Lelio
A Season in France by Mahamat Saleh Haroun
Battle of the Sexes by Jonathan Dayton and Valerie Faris
The Brawler by Anurag Kashyap
The Breadwinner by Nora Twomey
Call Me by Your Name by Luca Guadagnino
The Captain by Robert Schwentke
Catch the Wind by Gaël Morel
The Children Act by Richard Eyre
The Conformist by Cai Shangjun
The Cured by David Freyne
The Current War by Alfonso Gomez-Rejon
Disobedience by Sebastián Lelio
Downsizing by Alexander Payne
Dunkirk by Christopher Nolan
The Escape by Dominic Savage
Eye on Juliet by Kim Nguyen
First They Killed My Father by Angelina Jolie
The Florida Project by Sean Baker
Foxtrot by Samuel Maoz
The Guardians by Xavier Beauvois
Hostiles by Scott Cooper
The Hungry by Bornila Chatterjee
I Love You, Daddy by Louis C.K.
In the Fade by Fatih Akin
I, Tonya by Craig Gillespie
Journey's End by Saul Dibb
The Killing of a Sacred Deer by Yorgos Lanthimos
Kodachrome by Mark Raso
Lady Bird by Greta Gerwig
Lean on Pete by Andrew Haigh
Loving Pablo by Fernando León de Aranoa
Manhunt by John Woo
Mark Felt: The Man Who Brought Down the White House by Peter Landesman
Marrowbone by Sergio G. Sánchez
Making of Michael Jackson's Thriller by Jerry Kramer
Mektoub, My Love: Canto Uno by Abdellatif Kechiche
Michael Jackson's Thriller 3D by John Landis
Molly's Game by Aaron Sorkin
Mother! by Darren Aronofsky
The Motive by Manuel Martín Cuenca
Novitiate by Maggie Betts
Number One by Tonie Marshall
Omerta by Hansal Mehta
On Chesil Beach by Dominic Cooke
Outside In by Lynn Shelton
Papillon by Michael Noer
Plonger by Mélanie Laurent
The Price of Success by Teddy Lussi-Modeste
Professor Marston and the Wonder Women by Angela Robinson
Racer and the Jailbird by Michaël R. Roskam
Radiance by Naomi Kawase
Redoubtable by Michel Hazanavicius
The Rider by Chloé Zhao
Roman J. Israel, Esq. by Dan Gilroy
The Shape of Water by Guillermo del Toro
Sheikh Jackson by Amr Salama
The Square by Ruben Östlund
Submergence by Wim Wenders
Suburbicon by George Clooney
Thelma by Joachim Trier
Three Billboards Outside Ebbing, Missouri by Martin McDonagh
Three Peaks by Jan Zabeil
Unicorn Store by Brie Larson
Victoria & Abdul by Stephen Frears
Who We Are Now by Matthew Newton
You Disappear by Peter Schønau Fog
Youth by Feng Xiaogang

Midnight Madness
Bodied by Joseph Kahn
Brawl in Cell Block 99 by S. Craig Zahler
The Crescent by Seth A. Smith
The Disaster Artist by James Franco
Downrange by Ryuhei Kitamura
Great Choice by Robin Comisar
Let the Corpses Tan by Hélène Cattet and Bruno Forzani
Mom and Dad by Brian Taylor
Revenge by Coralie Fargeat
The Ritual by David Bruckner
Vampire Clay by Sôichi Umezawa

Masters
The Day After by Hong Sang-soo
Faces Places by Agnès Varda and JR
First Reformed by Paul Schrader
Happy End by Michael Haneke
The House by the Sea by Robert Guédiguian
Loveless by Andrey Zvyagintsev
The Other Side of Hope by Aki Kaurismäki
Our People Will Be Healed by Alanis Obomsawin
Rainbow: A Private Affair by Paolo and Vittorio Taviani
The Third Murder by Hirokazu Kore-eda
Zama by Lucrecia Martel

Documentaries
Azmaish: A Journey through the Subcontinent by Sabiha Sumar
Boom for Real: The Late Teenage Years of Jean-Michel Basquiat by Sara Driver
The Carter Effect by Sean Menard
The China Hustle by Jed Rothstein
Cocaine Prison by Violeta Ayala
Eric Clapton: Life in 12 Bars by Lili Fini Zanuck
Ex Libris: The New York Public Library by Frederick Wiseman
The Final Year by Greg Barker
The Gospel According to André by Kate Novack
Grace Jones: Bloodlight and Bami by Sophie Fiennes
Jim & Andy: the Great Beyond – the story of Jim Carrey & Andy Kaufman featuring a very special, contractually obligated mention of Tony Clifton by Chris Smith
Jane by Brett Morgen
The Judge by Erika Cohn
The Legend of the Ugly King by Hüseyin Tabak
Living Proof by Matt Embry
Lots of Kids, a Monkey and a Castle by Gustavo Salmerón
Love Means Zero by Jason Kohn
The Other Side of Everything by Mila Turajlić
Sammy Davis, Jr.: I've Gotta Be Me by Sam Pollard
Scotty and the Secret History of Hollywood by Matt Tyrnauer
Silas by Hawa Essuman and Anjali Nayar
Super Size Me 2: Holy Chicken! by Morgan Spurlock
There Is a House Here by Alan Zweig

Contemporary World Cinema
Alanis by Anahí Berneri
Ana, mon amour by Călin Peter Netzer
Angels Wear White by Vivian Qu
April's Daughter by Michel Franco
Arrhythmia by Boris Khlebnikov
Beyond Words by Urszula Antoniak
The Big Bad Fox and Other Tales... by Benjamin Renner, Patrick Imbert
Birds Without Names by Kazuya Shiraishi
Black Kite by Tarique Qayumi
Breath by Simon Baker
A Ciambra by Jonas Carpignano
Dark is the Night by Adolfo Alix Jr.
Directions by Stephan Komandarev
Disappearance by Boudewijn Koole
Don't Talk to Irene by Pat Mills
Euthanizer by Teemu Nikki
Félicité by Alain Gomis
Good Favour by Rebecca Daly
Hannah by Andrea Pallaoro
The Insult by Ziad Doueiri
Insyriated by Philippe Van Leeuw
The Journey by Mohamed Al-Daradji
Life and Nothing More by Antonio Méndez Esparza
The Little Girl Who Was Too Fond of Matches by Simon Lavoie
The Lodgers by Brian O'Malley
Longing by Savi Gabizon
Looking for Oum Kulthum by Shirin Neshat
Marlina the Murderer in Four Acts by Mouly Surya
Meditation Park by Mina Shum
Miami by Zaida Bergroth
Motorrad by Vicente Amorim
Nina by Juraj Lehotský
The Number by Khalo Matabane
On Body and Soul by Ildikó Enyedi
Porcupine Lake by Ingrid Veninger
Public Schooled by Kyle Rideout
Pyewacket by Adam MacDonald
Ravenous (Les Affamés) by Robin Aubert
The Royal Hibiscus Hotel by Ishaya Bako
Samui Song by Pen-Ek Ratanaruang
Sergio & Sergei by Ernesto Daranas Serrano
A Sort of Family by Diego Lerman
The Summit by Santiago Mitre
Tulipani, Love, Honour and a Bicycle by Mike van Diem
Under the Tree by Hafsteinn Gunnar Sigurðsson
Verónica by Paco Plaza
Wajib by Annemarie Jacir
Western by Valeska Grisebach

Contemporary World Speakers

Discovery
1% by Stephen McCallum
3/4 by Ilian Metev
Ava by Sadaf Foroughi
All You Can Eat Buddha by Ian Lagarde
Apostasy by Daniel Kokotajlo
Black Cop by Cory Bowles
The Butterfly Tree by Priscilla Cameron
Cardinals by Grayson Moore and Aidan Shipley
Disappearance by Ali Asgari
A Fish Out of Water by Lai Kuo-An
Five Fingers for Marseilles by Michael Matthews
The Future Ahead by Constanza Novick
The Garden by Sonja Kröner
The Great Buddha+ by Huang Hsin-Yao
Gutland by Govinda Van Maele
High Fantasy by Jenna Bass
Human Traces by Nick Gorman
I Kill Giants by Anders Walter
I Am Not a Witch by Rungano Nyoni
Indian Horse by Stephen Campanelli
Killing Jesus by Laura Mora
Kissing Candice by Aoife McArdle
Luk'Luk'I by Wayne Wapeemukwa
Mary Goes Round by Molly McGlynn
Messi and Maud by Marleen Jonkman
Miracle by Egle Vertelyte
Montana by Limor Shmila
Never Steady, Never Still by Kathleen Hepburn
Oblivion Verses by Alireza Khatami
Oh Lucy! by Atsuko Hirayanagi
The Poet and the Boy by Kim Yang-hee
Princesita by Marialy Rivas
Ravens by Jens Assur
Scaffolding by Matan Yair
Shuttle Life by Tan Seng Kiat
Simulation by Abed Abest
Soldiers. Story from Ferentari by Ivana Mladenovic
Suleiman Mountain by Elizaveta Stishova
The Swan by Ása Helga Hjörleifsdóttir
Tigre by Silvina Schnicer and Ulises Porra Guardiola
Valley of Shadows by Jonas Matzow Gulbrandsen
Village Rockstars by Rima Das
Waru by Briar Grace-Smith, Ainsley Gardiner, Renae Maihi, Casey Kaa, Awanui Simich-Pene, Chelsea Cohen, Katie Wolfe and Paula Jones
Winter Brothers by Hlynur Pálmason
A Worthy Companion by Carlos Sanchez and Jason Sanchez

Platform
Beast by Michael Pearce
Brad's Status by Mike White
Custody by Xavier Legrand
Dark River by Clio Barnard
The Death of Stalin by Armando Iannucci
Euphoria by Lisa Langseth
If You Saw His Heart by Joan Chemla
 by Barbara Albert
Razzia by Nabil Ayouch
The Seen and Unseen by Kamila Andini
Sweet Country by Warwick Thornton
What Will People Say by Iram Haq

Short Cuts
The Argument (with annotations) by Daniel Cockburn
Bickford Park by Dane Clark and Linsey Stewart
Bird by Molly Parker
Charles by Dominic Étienne Simard
Creatura Dada by Caroline Monnet
Crème de menthe by Philippe David Gagné and Jean-Marc E. Roy
The Crying Conch by Vincent Toi
The Drop In by Naledi Jackson
For Nonna Anna by Luis De Filippis
Grandmother by Trevor Mack
homer_b by Milos Mitrovic and Connor Sweeney
An Imagined Conversation: Kanye West & Stephen Hawking by Sol Friedman
Latched by Justin Harding and Rob Brunner
Lira's Forest by Connor Jessup
Midnight Confession by Maxwell McCabe-Lokos
Milk by Heather Young
Möbius by Sam Kuhn
Nuuca by Michelle Latimer
Pre-Drink by Marc-Antoine Lemire
Rupture by Yassmina Karajah
Shadow Nettes by Phillip Barker
Signature by Kei Chikaura
Stay, I Don't Want to Be Alone by Gabriel Savignac
The Tesla World Light by Matthew Rankin
Threads by Torill Kove
We Forgot to Break Up by Chandler Levack

Festival Street

Primetime
Alias Grace by Mary Harron
Dark by Baran bo Odar
The Deuce by Michelle MacLaren and Ernest Dickerson
The Girlfriend Experience by Amy Seimetz and Lodge Kerrigan
Under Pressure by Andrucha Waddington and Mini Kerti

Public Programme

Cinematheque
I've Heard the Mermaids Singing by Patricia Rozema
North of Superior by Graeme Ferguson
Picture of Light by Peter Mettler
Rude by Clement Virgo

Wavelengths
Beyond the One by Anna Marziano
Caniba by Veréna Paravel and Lucien Castaing-Taylor
Cocote by 	Nelson Carlo de Los Santos Arias
Dragonfly Eyes by Xu Bing
Le fort des fous by Narimane Nari
Good Luck by Ben Russell
Heart of a Mountain by Parastoo Anoushahpour, Ryan Ferko and Faraz Anoushahpour
Jeannette: The Childhood of Joan of Arc by Bruno Dumont
Mrs. Fang by Wang Bing
The Nothing Factory by Pedro Pinho
Occidental by Neil Beloufa
Palmerston Blvd. by Dan Browne
Prototype by Blake Williams
Scaffold by Kazik Radwanski
A Skin So Soft (Ta peau si lisse) by Denis Côté
Some Cities by Francesco Gagliardi
Turtles Are Always Home by Rawane Nassif
(100ft) by Minjung Kim

Canada's Top Ten
In December, TIFF programmers released their annual Canada's Top Ten list of the films selected as the ten best Canadian films of 2017. The selected films received a follow-up screening at the TIFF Bell Lightbox as a "Canada's Top Ten" minifestival in January 2018, where Unarmed Verses won the People's Choice Award.

Features

Short films

References

External links

 Official site
 2017 Toronto International Film Festival at IMDb

2017
2017 film festivals
2017 in Toronto
2017 in Canadian cinema
2017 festivals in North America